The noun skeet in Newfoundland and Labrador English is considered to be a pejorative epithet. Though it has never been formally defined in the Dictionary of Newfoundland English, it is used as a stereotype to describe someone who is ignorant, aggressive, and unruly, with a pattern of vernacular use of English, drug and alcohol use, and who is involved in petty crime, very similar to the word "chav" used in the UK.

From this noun, the adjective "skeety" is derived.

History 
The origin of this use of skeet is unknown. However, it is possible that it is a new use of an old word, coming out of the use of skeet as 'rascal'. There have been some who theorize that the use of the word skeet is linked to the townie versus bayman divide in Newfoundland and Labrador and how it speaks to class, education, and use of vernacular Newfoundland English.

Use as pejorative 
Skeet has been called a pan-provincial slur against rural life. It is linked to stereotypes of those living in outport communities: the use of vernacular Newfoundland English, living in economically poor areas, and to lower levels of education. Though vernacular use of English is on the decline in Newfoundland and Labrador, those that continue to speak using non-standard forms of English are often stereotyped as uneducated fishermen from Newfoundland outports.

Skeets are characterised as rough around the edges, unintelligent, poorly dressed, and poorly spoken. However, of equal importance is the skeets' connection to petty crime, and drug and alcohol use. Skeet stereotype is linked to those living in economically poor areas and lower levels of education. The stigma of being from a lower income area, or dropping out of school is associated with being a skeet, and it is unlikely that an educated or professional person would be associated with the term unless it was used in jest.

Ultimately, some believe that using the word skeet says more about the person using it than the person being referred to. It is a word that allows people to pass negative comment, and is more a reflection of modern post-capitalism culture than a true identity.

This use of skeet is virtually unknown outside of the province, though people displaying the same characteristics may be referred to as white trash, or trailer trash in some areas of Canada and the United States, chav in the United Kingdom, spide in Northern Ireland, or skanger in Ireland. Sandra Clarke suggests there could be a connection between skeet and Prince Edward Island's skite.

Pop culture 
Bands like Gazeebow Unit, a hip-hop group from Airport Heights, St. John's, Newfoundland and Labrador, play on some of the stereotypes of skeet, incorporating it into their music and parody the skeet stereotype.

Some local Newfoundland and Labrador companies have begun to use the word on some of their products.

See also
Gazeebow Unit, a Newfoundland rap group with skeet cultural references
Ned (Scottish)
Chav (United Kingdom)

References

Further reading
 ‘Not the Cream of the Crop': Using the Word 'Skeet' as Vernacular Speech in Newfoundland . Leslie Pierce, Folklore Department, Memorial University of Newfoundland, 2006.
 Best of St John's: Best of Local Slang. The Scope, 4 January 2012
 Hip-hop in a Post-insular Community: Hybridity, Local Language, and Authenticity in an Online Newfoundland Rap Group Sandra Clarke, Journal of English Linguistics, 2007

Anti-social behaviour
Canadian slang
Culture of Newfoundland and Labrador
Fashion aesthetics
Newfoundland and Labrador society
Class-related slurs
Social class subcultures
Stereotypes of the working class
Canadian youth culture
European-Canadian culture
Working-class culture in Canada
Socioeconomic stereotypes